Cai Xuetong (born 26 September 1993) is a Chinese snowboarder.

2010 Olympics
Cai represented China at the 2010 Winter Olympics in Vancouver, competing in the halfpipe discipline. She was the youngest competitor in the competition.

FIS Snowboard World Championships
Cai claimed the gold medal at the 2015 halfpipe events at the FIS Snowboard World Championships, and the silver medal in 2019.

FIS Snowboard World Cup
At the FIS Snowboard World Cup, Cai topped the halfpipe rankings in 2009–10, 2010–11, 2011–12, 2015–16, and 2018–19, as well as the freestyle overall ranking in 2010–11 and 2011–12. She has claimed 10 wins and 23 podiums in 32 starts.

References

External links
 
 
 
 
 

1993 births
Living people
Chinese female snowboarders
Snowboarders at the 2010 Winter Olympics
Snowboarders at the 2014 Winter Olympics
Snowboarders at the 2018 Winter Olympics
Snowboarders at the 2022 Winter Olympics
Olympic snowboarders of China
Sportspeople from Harbin
X Games athletes
Asian Games medalists in snowboarding
Snowboarders at the 2017 Asian Winter Games
Asian Games silver medalists for China
Medalists at the 2017 Asian Winter Games
Universiade medalists in snowboarding
Universiade gold medalists for China
Competitors at the 2015 Winter Universiade
21st-century Chinese women